Amfi Vågsbygd is a shopping mall in the centrum of the borough of Vågsbygd in the city of Kristiansand in Agder county, Norway. The mall has around 46 stores and occupies the same building as Vågsbygd Culture House and Vågsbygd High School.

References

External links
Amfi Vågsbygd Shopping Mall  www.visitnorway.com

Shopping centres in Norway
Geography of Kristiansand
Buildings and structures in Agder